The 1932 Freeport hurricane was an intense tropical cyclone that primarily affected areas of the Texas coast in August of the 1932 Atlantic hurricane season. It was the second storm and first hurricane of the season, developing just off the Yucatán Peninsula on August 12. While moving to the northwest, the storm began to quickly intensify the next day. After landfall, the hurricane began to quickly weaken before dissipating over the Texas Panhandle.

Record rainfall rates were also reported in some areas. Power outages were reported in Galveston and San Antonio. The storm caused $7.5 million in damages, mostly to crops, and 40 deaths.

Meteorological history

The Freeport hurricane was first noted by ships on August 12 as a tropical disturbance in the Gulf of Mexico. However, it was suggested in later research that the disturbance may have originated from a low-pressure area between Belize and Honduras on August 11. Steadily moving to the northwest, the storm began to intensify, reaching hurricane strength on August 13, and soon after reaching major hurricane strength later that day. A report remarked that the storm was "phenomenal" due to the fact that previously the storm had "seemed to be of only moderate intensity" while near land before rapidly intensifying.

Due to the storm's small size, it quickly weakened to tropical storm strength later that day. The storm finally weakened into a tropical depression before dissipating the next day over the Texas Panhandle.

Preparations, impact, and aftermath

In preparation for the storm, 150 vehicles evacuated out of Freeport, while water craft were taken up the Brazos River as far inland as possible. 100 families in Caplen and Gilchrist were also evacuated. The 38th division of the Texas National Guard, stationed in Palacios, was alerted due to the oncoming storm.

Heavy rainfall occurred across the coast and further inland due to the storm. Four locations set 24-hour rainfall records for the month of August, the highest of which was set near Angleton, recording  of rain on August 13. Angleton also faced a water shortage after its pumping station was destroyed.
Occupants in four vehicles were rescued by the United States Coast Guard near San Luis Pass. In Wharton, 800 birds went missing in the heavy rain. Galveston suffered primarily wind damage in the form of unroofed structures and broken windows. The Galveston Causeway was flooded by the heavy rain, preventing access from Galveston Island to the mainland.  Several other roads were blocked by fallen trees. 
The city was also affected by a power outage after the storm caused loss of power and damaged communication lines. In addition, communication lines in San Antonio were damaged.

At William P. Hobby Airport in Houston, 11 planes were damaged when a hangar collapsed, resulting in losses of $250,000. Hermann Park was also affected by the storm, where nine goats began to roam within the park due to a broken fence caused by a fallen limb. 35 convicts were freed from the Ramsey Unit state prison during the storm due to the chance of the prison collapsing. However, after the storm, only eight returned to the prison, leaving 27 others missing.

After the storm, the American Red Cross brought supplies to areas affected by the hurricane, requesting as much as $10,000 in relief work. Several other local relief committees also brought supplies to affected areas. An estimated $2 million in damages from the storm were attributed to crop damage alone, especially rice and cotton. The storm was estimated to have killed 40 people and caused $7.5 million in damage.

See also

1941 Texas hurricane
1949 Texas hurricane
Hurricane Harvey
List of Texas hurricanes (1900–49)

Notes

References

1932 natural disasters in the United States
Freeport
Category 4 Atlantic hurricanes
Hurricanes in Texas
1932 in Texas
Freeport, Texas